Melissa Caulfield (born 29 May 1988) is a retired Australian rules footballer who played for Fremantle and West Coast in the AFL Women's competition. Caulfield was drafted by Fremantle with their tenth selection and seventy-seventh overall in the 2016 AFL Women's draft. She played the first two matches of the year before missing the round three match against . She returned for the round four match against  and played every match for the remainder of the year apart from the last round of the season, and finished with five matches. In March 2022, Caulfield retired to focus on work and travel.

References

External links 

1988 births
Living people
Fremantle Football Club (AFLW) players
Australian rules footballers from Western Australia
West Coast Eagles (AFLW) players